Azeb Mesfin Haile (Amharic and ; born 21 December 1966) is an Ethiopian politician who was the second First Lady of Ethiopia from 2001 to 2012. Azeb is the widow of Ethiopian Prime Minister Meles Zenawi. She is the founder and patron of National Initiative for Mental Health of Ethiopia. In early 2009, she was appointed CEO of the Endowment Fund for the Rehabilitation of Tigray by its head Abadi Zemu.

Early life 
Azeb was born in rapart and raised in Gadarif, Eastern Sudan. She is from her peasant farmer father Mesfin Haile and mother Konjit Gola. Her maternal grandfather, Gola Goshu was as an Italian Askari during the Second Italo-Ethiopian War (1935–1936). Following his action to the country, Gola was killed by Ethiopian patriots. By her early age, Azeb raised with her aunt Maniahlosh Gola who is the daughter of this "Fitawrari" who had this title by Italian invaders to mean commander of the vanguard; which was feudal era military title.

Azeb was married to Ethiopian Prime Minister Meles Zenawi until his death in 2012. Together they had three children: Semhal, Marda and Senay Meles.

Career 
She was elected in 2005 to the House of Peoples' Representatives (the lower House of the Ethiopian Parliament) representing her home woreda of Welkait and Humera, and serves as chair of its Social Affairs Standing Committee. Her role has at times been controversial, with some members of Ethiopian diaspora alleging that, during the period in which she was an executive at the parastatal Mega Corporation, she was involved in "the impropriety of mingling public, private and party-owned businesses."

However Azeb is also known for her work to teach rural Ethiopians about the issues of HIV/AIDS 
Her appearance at a special ceremony to honor the First Ladies of Africa for their efforts against the spread of HIV/AIDS held by Georgetown University of Washington DC on 15 January 2007 was met by protests of exiled Ethiopians." The University was awarding its "John Thompson Legacy of a Dream Award" to the Organization of African First Ladies against HIV/AIDS for its leadership and service toward the ideals of Dr. Martin Luther King, Jr. Mesfin was to accept the award on behalf of the organization along with the first ladies of Zambia and Rwanda.

She started the organization "Ethiopian Coalition of Women against HIV/AIDS" and continues to work closely with community leaders to ensure the rights of women, fight harmful traditional practices and HIV/AIDS. She said the award she received is not just for her organization but for the entire Ethiopian women declaring "the award is the result of the relentless struggle waged by Ethiopian women.

See also 

 First Lady of Ethiopia

References

1966 births
20th-century births
Living people
Members of the House of Peoples' Representatives
Spouses of prime ministers of Ethiopia
First ladies of Ethiopia
Ethiopian businesspeople
Ethiopian Orthodox Christians
Ethiopian women's rights activists
People from Tigray Region
21st-century Ethiopian women politicians
21st-century Ethiopian politicians